Saint Anthony Hospital is located in Milwaukee, Wisconsin.

History
The building served as a hospital for several decades before becoming a family medical center for a brief time in the late 1980s. It has also been used as a detention center. The building was added to the State and the National Register of Historic Places in 2017. Also that year, a nonprofit organization bought the building with plans to convert it into apartments.

References

Hospital buildings on the National Register of Historic Places in Wisconsin
Residential buildings on the National Register of Historic Places in Wisconsin
National Register of Historic Places in Milwaukee
Residential buildings in Milwaukee
Detention centers
Mediterranean Revival architecture in Wisconsin
Brick buildings and structures
Hospital buildings completed in 1931
1931 establishments in Wisconsin